Mesocacia multimaculata is a species of beetle in the family Cerambycidae. It was described by Maurice Pic in 1925, originally under the genus Ereis. It is known from India, China, Thailand, Laos, and Vietnam.

References

Mesosini
Beetles described in 1925